This is a list of World War II military vehicles of Germany.

By name 

 Artillerie Panzerbeobachtungswagen  - artillery observation post tank, multiple chassis variants
 Artillerie-Schlepper 35(t)  - artillery tractor version of the Panzerkampfwagen 35(t)
 Aufklärer auf Fahrgestell Panzerkampfwagen 38(t) - reconnaissance vehicle on a Panzer 38(t) chassis
 Begleitwagen (secret/camouflage designation for the Panzer IV)
 Bergepanzer III (armored recovery vehicle version of the Panzer III)
 Bergepanzer IV (armored recovery vehicle version of the Panzer IV)
 Bergepanzer 38(t) (armored recovery vehicle version of the Jagdpanzer 38(t))
 Bergepanzer Tiger Ausf. E (recovery version of the Tiger I Ausf E)
 Bergepanzer Tiger (P) (recovery version of the Elefant)
 Bergepanzerwagen II (armoured engineer vehicle version of the Panzer II Ausf J)
 BMW R75  (two wheel drive motorcycle with side car)
 Borgward B I (company designation for the Minenräumwagen 3-wheel version)
 Borgward B II (company designation for the Minenräumwagen 4-wheel version)
 Borgward B III  - armoured ammunition carrier
 Borgward B IV - heavy demolition charge layer
 Brückenleger auf Panzerkampfwagen I Ausf. A - bridge laying version of the Panzer I Ausf A
 Brückenleger auf Panzerkampfwagen II - bridge laying version of the Panzer II
 Brückenleger IV - bridge laying version of the Panzer IV
 Flakpanzer Coelian - Panther tank based twin 37 mm antiaircraft tank
 Durchbruchwagen - developmental name for concepts for the Tiger I
 Elefant - tank destroyer version of the Tiger I (P)
 Fahrgestell Panzerkampfwagen II (Sf) - Panzer II chassis used for self-propelled guns
 Fahrgestell Panzerkampfwagen III - Panzer III chassis
 Fahrgestell Panzerkampfwagen IV (Sf) - Panzer IV chassis used for self-propelled guns
 Fahrgestell Panzerkampfwagen 38(t) (Panzer 38(t) chassis)
 Fahrgestell Zugkraftwagen 1t (Sd.Kfz. 10 chassis)
 Fahrgestell Zugkraftwagen 5t (Sd.Kfz. 6 chassis)
 Ferdinand (early name for the Elefant)
 Feuerleitpanzerfahrzeug für V2 Raketen auf Zugkraftwagen 8t (V2 command post variant of the Sd.Kfz. 7)
 Flakpanzer I (self-propelled anti-aircraft gun on a Panzer I chassis)
 Flakpanzer IV mit 2 cm FlaK Vierling (title for the Wirbelwind)
 Flakpanzer IV mit 3 cm FlaK Vierling (title for the Zerstörer 45)
 Flakpanzer IV mit 3.7 cm FlaK (short title for the Ostwind I)
 Flakpanzer IV mit 3.7 cm FlaK Zwilling (title for the Ostwind II)
 Flakpanzer 38(t) auf Selbstfahrlafette 38(t) Ausf. L (antiaircraft tank version of the Panzer 38(t))
 Flamingo (common name for the Panzer II Flamm)
 Flammenwerfer auf Panzerkampfwagen I Ausf. A - flamethrowers mounted in a Panzer I Ausf. A
 Flammpanzer 38(t) - flamethrower version of the Jagdpanzer 38(t)
 Funkkraftwagen - designation for the Kfz 14
 Gefechtsaufklärer VK 1602 - combat reconnaissance version of the Panzer II
 Gepanzerter Mannschaftstransportwagen (title for the Kätzchen)
 Gepanzerter Munitionsschlepper (full title for the Borgward B III)
 Gepanzerte Selbstfahrlafette für Sturmgeschütz (full title for the StuG III)
 Gepanzerte Selbstfahrlafette für Sturmgeschütz (Fl) (flamethrower version of the StuG III)
 Gepanzerte Selbstfahrlafette für Sturmhaubitze (full title for the StuH 42)
 Gepanzerte Selbstfahrlafette für Sturminfanteriegeschütz (full title for the StuIG 33B)
 Gepanzerter Zugkraftwagen 8t (designation for the Sd.Kfz. 7)
 Gerät 35 (equipment number for the ammunition carrier version of the Panzer I)
 Gerät 040 (equipment number for the 60 cm armed Karlgerät)
 Gerät 041 (equipment number for the 54 cm armed Karlgerät)
 Gerät 46 (equipment number for the Panther tank)
 Gerät 67 (equipment number for the Goliath vehicle with E-motor)
 Gerät 71 (equipment number for the Schwere Wehrmachtschlepper)
 Gerät 80 (equipment number for the Sd.Kfz. 221)
 Gerät 81 (equipment number for the Sd.Kfz. 222)
 Gerät 82 (equipment number for the Sd.Kfz. 223)
 Gerät 83 (equipment number for the Sd.Kfz. 260)
 Gerät 84 (equipment number for the Sd.Kfz. 261)
 Gerät 89 (equipment number for the Sd.Kfz. 250)
 Gerät 90 (equipment number for the Sd.Kfz. 251)
 Gerät 383 (equipment number for the Panzerkampfwagen E-100)
 Gerät 550 (equipment number for the Panzer IV Ausf J)
 Gerät 554 (equipment number for the Flakpanzer Coelian)
 Gerät 555 (equipment number for the Hetzer)
 Gerät 556 (equipment number for the Kugelblitz)
 Gerät 558 (equipment number for the Panzer IV/70(A) version of the Panzer IV)
 Gerät 559 (equipment number for the Panzer IV/70(V) version of the Panzer IV)
 Gerät 573 (equipment number for the engineer version of the Hetzer)
 Gerät 582 (equipment number for the Ostwind I)
 Gerät 587 (equipment number for the weapons carrier version of the Panzer 38(t))
 Gerät 588 (equipment number for the sIG 33 version of the Hetzer)
 Gerät 671 (equipment number for the Goliath vehicle with V-motor)
 Gerät 672 (equipment number for the Goliath vehicle with V-motor)
 Gerät 680 (equipment number for the Springer vehicle)
 Gerät 690 (equipment number for the Borgward B IV)
 Gerät 803 (equipment number for the Wespe)
 Gerät 805 (equipment number for the Grille (architecture) PzKpfw 38(t) version)
 Gerät 806 (equipment number for the Grille (architecture) Sfl 38(t) version)
 Gerät 807 (equipment number for the Hummel)
 Gerät 811 (equipment number for the Geschützwagen Panther version of the Panther tank)
 Gerät 820 (equipment number for the StuG IV)
 Gerät 821 (equipment number for the Jagdpanzer IV version of the Panzer IV)
 Gerät 892 (equipment number for the cable-laying version of the Sd.Kfz. 250)
 Gerät 893 (equipment number for the radio carrier version of the Sd.Kfz. 250)
 Geschützwagen III/IV - title for the Hummel and Nashorn chassis
 Geschützwagen IV (title for the gun carrier version of the Panzer IV
 Geschützwagen Panther (Gun carrier version of the Panther tank
 Geschützwagen Tiger (Gun carrier version of the Tiger II)
 Goliath vehicle - remote-control demolition charge
 Grille (architecture) (popular name for the sIG 33 version of the Panzer 38(t))
 Grosstraktor - early medium tank design
 Hetzer - popular but wrong name for the Jagdpanzer 38(t)
 Hornisse - earlier name for the Nashorn
 Hummel (popular name for the 15 cm howitzer armed Geschützwagen III/IV)
 Infanterie Sturmsteg auf Fahrgestell Panzerkampfwagen IV (infantry assault bridge version of the Panzer IV)
 Instandsetzungskraftwagen I (maintenance vehicle version of the Panzer I)
 Jagdpanther (common name for the 88 mm antitank gun-armed tank destroyer version of the Panther tank)
 Jagdpanzer IV (Panzer IV-hulled casemate style tank destroyer)
 Jagdpanzer 38(d) (German development project for the Jagdpanzer 38(t))
 Jagdpanzer 38(t) (correct name for the Hetzer)
 Jagdtiger (128 mm antitank gun armed tank destroyer version of the Tiger II)
 Karl-Gerät (self-propelled siege mortar)
 Kätzchen (armoured personnel carrier)
 Kfz 13 (machine gun car)
 Kfz 14 (radio car)
 Kleiner Panzerbefehlswagen (light command tank version of the Panzer I)
 Kleiner Panzerfunkwagen (designation for the Sd.Kfz. 260 and Sd.Kfz. 261)
 Kleines Kettenkraftrad HK 101 (Sd.Kfz. 2, little tracked motorcycle)
 Königstiger (common alternative name for the Tiger II)
 Krupp Minenraumer S (anti-mine vehicle)
 Krupp Traktor LaS (company name for the Panzer I)
 Ladungsleger auf Panzerkampfwagen I Ausf. B (explosives laying gear mounted on a Panzer I Ausf. B)
 Land-Wasser-Schlepper (amphibious tractor)
 LaS (abbreviation for Landwirtschaftlicher Schlepper, secret/camouflage designation for the Panzer I; also used for Panzer II)
 LaS 100 (company name for the Panzer II)
 LaS 138 (company name for Christie suspension version of the Panzer II)
 LaS 762 (company name for the Panzer Selbstfahrlafette 1 für 7.62 cm Pak 36 version of the Panzer II, later renamed Marder II)
 LaS Maybach (cover name for Panzer I Ausf. B)
 Leichter Beobachtungswagen (artillery observation post version of the Sd.Kfz. 250)
 Leichter Einheitswaffenträger (development project for a light weapons carrier version of the Panzer 38(t))
 Leichter Fernsprechpanzerwagen (title for the cable-laying version of the Sd.Kfz. 250)
 Leichter Flakpanzer IV (title for the Kugelblitz)
 Leichter Funkpanzerwagen (title for the radio carrying version of the Sd.Kfz. 250)
 Leichter gepanzerter Beobachtungskraftwagen (title for the Sd.Kfz. 253)
 Leichter gepanzerter Kraftwagen (early designation for the Sd.Kfz. 250)
 Leichter gepanzerter Munitionskraftwagen (designation for the Sd.Kfz. 252)
 Leichter Ladungsträger Goliath (title for the Goliath tracked mine)
 Leichter Messtruppanzerwagen (survey vehicle version of the Sd.Kfz. 250)
 Leichter Munitionspanzerwagen (ammunition carrier version of the Sd.Kfz. 250)
 Leichter Panzerspähwagen (Fu) (designation for the Sd.Kfz. 223)
 Leichter Panzerspähwagen (MG) (designation for the Sd.Kfz. 221)
 Leichter Panzerspähwagen (2 cm) (designation for the Sd.Kfz. 222)
 Leichter Schützenpanzerwagen (later designation for the Sd.Kfz. 250)
 Leichter Truppenluftschützenpanzerwagen (designation for the light antiaircraft version of the Sd.Kfz. 250)
 Leichter Wehrmachtschlepper (program for light utility tractor)
 Leichttraktor (early light tank design)
 Leopard (popular name for the Gefechtsaufklärer VK1602 version of the Panzer II)
 Luchs - popular name for the Panzer II Ausf. L
 LWS (abbreviation for the Land-Wasser-Schlepper)
 Marder I (popular name for the 75 mm antitank gun on a Panzer II chassis)
 Marder II (popular name for the 75 mm antitank gun on a Panzer II chassis)
 Marder III (popular name for the tank hunter version of the Panzer 38(t))
 Maschinengewehrkraftwagen (designation for the Kfz 13)
 Maultier (halftrack conversion of various trucks)
 Maus (common name for the Panzer VIII Maus)
 Minenräumpanzer III (mine destroyer version of the Panzer III)
 Minenräumwagen (remote control mine destroyer)
 Mittlerer Einheitswaffenträger (development project for a medium universal weapons carrier version of the Panzer 38(t))
 Mittlerer Funkpanzerwagen (radio carrier version of the Sd.Kfz. 251)
 Mittlerer gepanzerter Beobachtungskraftwagen (designation for the Saurer RR-7)
 Mittlerer gepanzerter Mannschaftskraftwagen (early designation for the Sd.Kfz. 251)
 Mittlerer Kommandopanzerwagen (command post version of the Sd.Kfz. 251)
 Mittlerer Krankenpanzerwagen (ambulance version of the Sd.Kfz. 251)
 Mittlerer Ladungsträger (title for the Springer vehicle)
 Mittlerer Pionierpanzerwagen (engineer version of the Sd.Kfz. 251)
 Mittlerer Schützenpanzerwagen (designation for the Sd.Kfz. 251
 Möbelwagen (common name for 20 mm and 37 mm antiaircraft versions of the Panzer IV)
 Mörser Zugmittel 35(t) (mortar tractor version of the Panzer 35(t))
 Mörserträger auf Fahrgestell Panzerkampfwagen 38(t) (mortar carrier on a Panzer 38(t) chassis)
 Munitionspanzer 38(t) (Sf) Ausf. K (ammunition carrier version of the Grille (architecture))
 Munitionspanzer auf Fahrgestell Panzerkampfwagen III (ammunition carrier using a Panzer III chassis)
 Munitionspanzer auf Fahrgestell Sturmgeschütz III (ammunition carrier version of the StuG III)
 Munitionsschlepper auf Fahrgestell Panzerkampfwagen 38(t) (ammunition carrier using a Panzer 38(t) chassis)
 Munitionsschlepper auf Panzerkampfwagen I Ausf. A (ammunition carrier version of the Panzer I Ausf. A)
 Munitionsschlepper für Karlgerät (ammunition carrier for the Gerät 040 based on the Panzer IV Ausf. D)
 Munitions Selbstfahrlafette auf Fahrgestell Panzerkampfwagen II (ammunition carrier version of the Wespe)
 Nashorn - later name for the 8.8 cm armed self-propelled antitank gun on Geschützwagen III/IV chassis, formerly known as Hornisse
 Neubaufahrzeug - early multi-turret medium tank design
 Ostwind - popular name for the Flakpanzer IV mit 3.7 cm FlaK
 Panther tank (name for the Panzerkampfwagen V)
 Jagdpanzer IV/70 (75 mm L/70 gun armed assault gun version of the Jagdpanzer IV, also Panzer IV/70)
 Panzerbefehlswagen III (command tank version of the Panzer III)
 Panzerbefehlswagen IV (command tank version of the Panzer IV)
 Panzerbefehlswagen Panther (command tank version of the Panther tank)
 Panzerbeobachtungswagen IV (artillery observation post version of the Panzer IV)
 Panzerbeobachtungswagen Panther (artillery observation post version of the Panther tank)
 Panzerfähre (armoured ferry version of the Panzer IV)
 Panzerjäger I (short title for the 4.7 PaK(t) (Sf) on a Panzer I Ausf B)
 Panzerjäger 38(t) (standard designation for the Marder III version of the Panzer 38(t))
 Panzerjägerwagen 638 (alternative designation for the Hetzer)
 Panzerkampfwagen I (full title for the Panzer I)
 Panzerkampfwagen I nA (interleaved suspension version of the Panzer I, the Ausf C)
 Panzerkampfwagen I nA Verstärkt (reinforced version of the Panzer I, the Ausf F)
 Panzerkampfwagen I ohne Aufbau (Panzer I without superstructure)
 Panzerkampfwagen II (full title for the Panzer II)
 Panzerkampfwagen II Flamm (flamethrower version of the Panzer II)
 Panzerkampfwagen II mit Schwimmkörper (Panzer II with amphibious floats)
 Panzerkampfwagen II nA (interleaved suspension version of the Panzer II, the Ausf G)
 Panzerkampfwagen II nA Verstärkt (reinforced version of the Panzer II, the Ausf J)
 Panzerkampfwagen II ohne Aufbau (Panzer II without superstructure)
 Panzerkampfwagen III (full title for the Panzer III)
 Panzerkampfwagen III (Fl) (flamethrower version of the Panzer III)
 Panzerkampfwagen IV (full title for the Panzer IV)
 Panzerkampfwagen V (full title for the Panther tank)
 Panzerkampfwagen VI (full title for the VK30.01, VK36.01, Tiger I and Tiger II tanks)
 Panzerkampfwagen VII (full title for the Panzer VII)
 Panzerkampfwagen VIII (full name for the Panzer VIII Maus)
 Panzerkampfwagen 35(t) (full title for the Panzer 35(t) captured LT vz 35)
 Panzerkampfwagen 38(t) (full title for the Panzer 38(t) Czech LT vz 38)
 Panzerkampfwagen E-25 (experimental assault gun design)
 Panzerkampfwagen E-50 (experimental medium tank design)
 Panzerkampfwagen E-75 (experimental heavy tank design)
 Panzerkampfwagen E-100 (experimental super heavy tank design)
 Panzerkampfwagen T-25 (designation for the Skoda T-25)
 Panzerspähwagen II (reconnaissance version of the Panzer II)
 Panzerspähwagen T-15 (designation for the Skoda T-15)
 Panzer-Bergegerät (recovery vehicle version of the Panther tank)
 Panzer Selbstfahrlafette 1 (armoured self-propelled mount version of the Panzer II)
 Panzer Selbstfahrlafette IV (armored self-propelled mount version of the Panzer IV)
 Panzer Selbstfahrlafette V (armored self-propelled mount version of the Tiger I)
 Pionierkampfwagen II (engineer fighting vehicle version of the Panzer II)
 Pionierpanzerwagen auf Fahrgestell Panzerkampfwagen III (armored engineer vehicle version of the Panzer III)
 Porsche 205 (company designation for the Panzer VIII Maus)
 Raupenschlepper, Ost (light tractor)
 RSO (abbreviation for the Raupenschlepper, Ost)
 Saurer RR-7 (artillery tractor and observation post)
 Schützenpanzerwagen auf Fahrgestell Panzerkampfwagen 38(t) (armored infantry vehicle version of the Panzer 38(t))
 Schwerer Ladungsträger (title for the Borgward B IV)
 Schwerer Panzerspähwagen (designation for the Sd.Kfz. 231)
 Schwerer Wagen (developmental program name for the Panzer VII)
 Schwerer Wehrmachtschlepper (heavy military carrier)
 Sd.Kfz. - abbreviation for "special purpose vehicle"; see list of Sd.Kfz. designations
 Selbstfahrlafette 38(t) (self-propelled mount version of the Panzer 38(t))
 Sonderschlepper B III (alternative title for the Borgward B III)
 Sonderschlepper B IV (alternative title for the Borgward B IV)
 Springer vehicle (demolition laying vehicle)
 Sturmgeschütz III (shortened title for the StuG III assault gun)
 Sturmgeschütz IV (title of the StuG IV assault gun)
 Sturmgeschütz mit 8.8 cm PaK 43/2 (full title of the Elefant)
 Sturmmörser Tiger (assault rocket mortar version of the Tiger I)
 Sturmpanther (proposal for 15 cm sIG armed assault version of the Panther tank)
 Sturmpanzer I (early self-propelled assault gun)
 Sturmpanzer II (self-propelled assault gun)
 Sturmpanzer IV (title of the Brummbär)
 Tauchpanzer III (amphibious version of the Panzer III)
 Tauchpanzer IV (amphibious version of the Panzer IV)
 Tiger I (common name for the Panzerkampfwagen VI Ausf E)
 Tiger II (common name for the Panzerkampfwagen VI Ausf B)
 VK302 (experimental designation for the Borgward B III)
 VK601 (experimental designation for the Panzer I Ausf C)
 VK901 (experimental designation for the Panzer II Ausf G)
 VK903 (experimental designation for the Panzer II Ausf H)
 VK1301 (experimental designation for the Panzer II Ausf M)
 VK1303 (experimental designation for the Panzer II Ausf L)
 VK1601 (experimental designation for the Panzer II Ausf J)
 VK1602 (experimental designation for the combat reconnaissance version of the Panzer II)
 VK1801 (experimental designation for the Panzer I Ausf F)
 VK2001(D) (experimental designation for the Daimler proposal for the Panzer IV)
 VK2001(K) (experimental designation for the Krupp proposal for the Panzer IV)
 VK2001(Rh) (experimental designation for the Rheinmetall proposal for the Panzer IV)
 VK2002(MAN) (experimental designation for the MAN proposal for the Panzer IV)
 VK3001(H) (experimental designation for the Henschel proposal for the Tiger I)
 VK3001(P) (experimental designation for the Porsche proposal for the Tiger I)
 VK3002(MAN) (experimental designation for the Panther tank)
 VK3002(DB) (experimental designation for the Daimler-Benz proposal for the Panther tank)
 VK3601(H) (experimental designation for the Henschel development vehicle for the Tiger I)
 VK4501(H) (experimental designation for the Henschel production vehicle for the Tiger I)
 VK4501(P) (experimental designation for the Porsche proposal for the Tiger I(P))
 VK4502(P) (experimental designation for the Porsche development vehicle Porsch Typ 180 (front turret) and Porsche Typ 181 (central turret) for the Tiger II )
 VK4503 (experimental designation for the Henschel development vehicle for the Tiger II)
 VK6501(H) (experimental designation for the Henschel proposal for the Panzer VII)
 VK7201(K) (experimental designation)
 Volkswagen Kübelwagen (military version of the Volkswagen. A later version sold in the US as the Thing.)
 Volkswagen Schwimmwagen (amphibious variant of the Volkswagen Kübelwagen)
 VsKfz 617 (experimental designation for the Panzer I Ausf A)
 VsKfz 622 (experimental designation for the Panzer II Ausf a)
 Waffenträger Geschützwagen IV (title for the Heuschrecke 10)
 Wespe (common name for the 10.5 cm leFH 18/2 auf Fahrgestell Panzerkampfwagen II (Sf))
 Wirbelwind (common name for the quad 20 mm armed version of the Flakpanzer IV)
 Wurfrahmen 40 (a self-propelled multiple rocket launcher)
 Zugführerwagen (secret/camouflage designation for the Panzer III)
 Zugkraftwagen 1t (designation for the Sd.Kfz. 10)
 Zugkraftwagen 3t (designation for the Sd.Kfz. 11)
 Zugkraftwagen 5t (designation for the Sd.Kfz. 6)
 Zugkraftwagen 8t (designation for the Sd.Kfz. 7)
 Zugkraftwagen 12t (designation for the Sd.Kfz. 8)
 Zugkraftwagen 18t (designation for the Sd.Kfz. 9)
 Zündapp KS 750 (two wheel drive motorcycle with side car)

See also 

 List of military vehicles of World War II#Germany
 German armoured fighting vehicles of World War II
 German tanks in World War II
 List of Sd.Kfz. designations

References

Citations

Bibliography

Military vehicles of Germany
World War II armoured fighting vehicles of Germany